Clyde Hill may refer to:
 Clyde Hill, Washington
 Clyde Hill (footballer) (1895–1965), Australian rules footballer